Survey Methodology (or Techniques d'enquête in the French version) is a peer-reviewed open access scientific journal that publishes papers related to the development and application of survey techniques. It is published by Statistics Canada, the national statistical office of Canada, in English and French.

The journal started publishing in 1975, publishes two issues each year, and is available both in print (with a subscription fee) and online as open access.

Abstracting and indexing 
Survey Methodology is indexed in the following services:

 Current Index to Statistics
 Science Citation Index Expanded
 Social Sciences Citation Index

External links 
 

Survey methodology
Publications established in 1975
Multilingual journals
Biannual journals
Open access journals
Statistics journals
Academic journals published by governments
English-language journals
French-language journals
Hijacked journals